The 14th annual Miss Earth México pageant was held at the Hacienda Doña Isabel of Bahía Príncipe Riviera Maya Resorts, Tulum, Quintana Roo on September 19, 2015. Thirty-two contestants of the Mexican Republic competed for the national title, which was won by Gladys Flores from Puebla who later competed in Miss Earth 2015 in Austria. Flores was crowned by outgoing Miss Earth México titleholder Yareli Carrillo and Miss Earth 2014 Jamie Herrell. She is the first Poblana to win this title.

Results

Miss Earth México

Special Awards

Judges

Preliminary Competition
 Anette Cuburu - TV Hostess
 Isaura Espinoza - Actress
 Alejandro Tomassi - Actor
 Fernanda Tapia
 Paty Cantú - Singer

Final Competition
 Pablo Patton - HR Manager of Earth Checo
 Paola Aguilar - Miss Earth México 2012
 Fernando Santos - Gaviota International Awards' President
 Kateryna Olek - Fashion Designer
 Jesús Gallegos - TV y Novelas magazine's Founder
 Irma Sebada - International Franchice's Director of Miss Earth México
 Isaura Espinosa - Actress
 Paola Arsof - Mexican Lady of Society
 Yazuri González - Fashion Designer
 María Luisa Villarreal - Reina de la Feria de Tulum 2008
 Wendy Ruíz - Politician

Contestants

References

External links
 Official Website

2015
2015 in Mexico
2015 beauty pageants